The New Zealand men's national 3x3 team is the 3x3 basketball team representing New Zealand in international men's competitions.

The team competed at the 2022 Commonwealth Games in Birmingham, England.

World Cup record

References

External links

Basketball in New Zealand
3
Men's national 3x3 basketball teams